Wallace House is a historic home located at Lebanon, Laclede County, Missouri.  It was built in 1876–1877, and is a two-story, Stick style / Eastlake movement frame dwelling. It features decorated gables, a corner bay window, and a porch with squared columns and cut-out brackets.  A larger front porch and a porte cochere were added about 1909.

It was listed on the National Register of Historic Places in 1984.

References

Houses on the National Register of Historic Places in Missouri
Queen Anne architecture in Missouri
Houses completed in 1877
Buildings and structures in Laclede County, Missouri
National Register of Historic Places in Laclede County, Missouri
1877 establishments in Missouri